The island glass lizard (Ophisaurus compressus) is a species of lizard in the family Anguidae. The species is endemic to the southeastern United States.

Geographic range
O. compressus is found in Florida, southeastern Georgia, and southeastern South Carolina.

Reproduction
O. compressus is oviparous.

References

Further reading
Behler JL, King FW (1979). The Audubon Society Guide to North American Reptiles and Amphibians. New York: Alfred A. Knopf. 743 pp. . (Ophisaurus compressus, p. 544 + Plate 454).
Conant R (1975). A Field Guide to Reptiles and Amphibians of Eastern and Central North America, Second Edition. Boston: Houghton Mifflin. xviii + 429 pp. + Plates 1-48.  (hardcover),  (paperback). (Ophisaurus compressus, p. 134 + Figure 30 on p. 132 + Map 96).
Cope ED (1900). "II. The Crocodilians, Lizards, and Snakes of North America". pp. 153–1270 + Plates 1-36. In: Anonymous (1900). Annual Report of the Board of Regents of the Smithsonian Institution, Showing the Operations, Expenditures, and Condition of the Institution for the Year Ending June 30, 1898. Washington, District of Columbia: Government Printing Office. 1,294 pp. (Ophisaurus ventralis compressus, new subspecies, pp. 501-502, Figure 90).
Smith HM, Brodie ED Jr (1982). Reptiles of North America: A Guide to Field Identification. New York: Golden Press. 240 pp. . (Ophisaurus compressus, pp. 90–91).

Ophisaurus
Reptiles described in 1900
Reptiles of the United States
Endemic fauna of the United States
Taxa named by Edward Drinker Cope